The Scout and Guide movement in Peru is served by
 Asociación Nacional de Guías Scouts del Perú, member of the World Association of Girl Guides and Girl Scouts
 Asociación de Scouts del Perú, member of the World Organization of the Scout Movement
 Movimiento Scout Católico del Perú
 Asociación Peruana de Escultismo
 Asociación Peruana de los Scouts del Mundo, member of the Order of World Scouts
 Asociación Peruana de Scouts de Baden Powell
 Exploradores Peruanos, member of the Club de Exploradores
 Unión de Scouts Tradicionales de América Perú, member of the Order of World Scouts

International Scout Units in Peru

There are also American Boy Scouts in Lima, linked to the Direct Service branch of the Boy Scouts of America, which supports units around the world.

External links

 Asociación Peruana de Escultismo
 Asociación Peruana de los Scouts del Mundo
 Exploradores Peruanos
 Movimiento Scout Católico del Perú
 Unión de Scouts Tradicionales de América Perú